Ben Bodé is an American actor.

He was born in Livermore, California, and studied acting at the Juilliard School in New York City.

He starred in the TV series Campus Cops, and the movies Empire Records and Jake's Closet.

He has also had guest starring roles in TV shows such as Boston Legal, CSI: NY, Cold Case, The King of Queens, Lab Rats and House, among many others.

References

External links

 Ben Bodé Fan Website

American male television actors
Juilliard School alumni
Living people
Year of birth missing (living people)
People from Livermore, California
20th-century American male actors
American male film actors